Summer of 84 is a 2018 teen horror film directed by François Simard, Anouk Whissell and Yoann-Karl Whissell and written by Matt Leslie and Stephen J. Smith. The film stars Graham Verchere, Judah Lewis, Caleb Emery, Cory Gruter-Andrew, Jason Gray-Stanford, Tiera Skovbye, and Rich Sommer.

The film premiered at the Sundance Film Festival on January 22, 2018. It was given a limited theatrical release in the United States on August 10, 2018, by Gunpowder & Sky. It received positive reviews from critics, with many praising the performances, direction, acting, dark humor, and screenplay, with many calling it one of the best horror films of 2018.

Plot
Over the course of the decade leading up to the summer of 1984, a total of thirteen teenage boys have disappeared in Cape May, Oregon but their disappearances have never been connected.

As the summer begins, fifteen-year-old Davey Armstrong, who works a paper route, initially enjoys carefree diversion with his friends, Dale "Woody" Woodworth, Curtis Farraday, and Tommy "Eats" Eaton. They spend their idle time in a treehouse on Eats' property, which he warns is in danger of being torn down by his belligerent father. They often fantasize about an attractive older girl neighbor, Nikki, who had previously been Davey's babysitter when he was younger.

When a local newspaper receives an anonymous letter from someone claiming responsibility for the boys' murders, Davey suspects that his neighbor Wayne Mackey, a popular police officer in their hometown of Ipswich, is the Cape May Slayer. Davey's friends reject this theory, on account of Davey's reputation for conspiracy theories and urban legends. However, when a boy Davey had seen inside Mackey's house appears on the back of a milk carton days later, they agree to help him investigate. Concurrently, Nikki begins visiting with Davey, confiding in him that her parents are divorcing and she will be leaving the neighborhood, and her mixed feelings about this major change.

The boys document Mackey's daily routine and discover many suspicious activities: Mackey regularly purchases gardening tools and bags of soil, brings a duffel bag to work everyday, and goes on late-night jogs. One night, Mackey witnesses Davey plant a walkie-talkie outside his window, leaving Davey worried that he is becoming suspicious. Woody and Farraday later discover a second vehicle and canisters of sodium hydroxide in Mackey's self-storage room, and Davey and Eats discover the bloodstained shirt of the missing boy in Mackey's garden shed. They present their evidence to Davey's parents, who are outraged at the boys, calling their investigation vandalism. Mr. Armstrong brings the boys to Mackey's house and has them apologize. Mackey expresses no hard feelings but Davey is grounded.

The next day, Mackey visits Davey's home and, having said that the boy who visited his home was his nephew, attempts to call his nephew as proof of his innocence, but the call is not answered. Davey discovers that Mackey dialed his own phone number. The following day, a suspect is arrested in the Cape May Slayer case, with Mackey the arresting officer. Disgusted, Davey makes plans to break into Mackey's home during the Cape May Festival. Farraday, who attends the festival as a lookout, discovers that the bags of soil were purchased for a city beautification project, and he and Eats abandon their posts.

Davey, Woody, and Nikki enter Mackey's home with Mr. Armstrong's video camera and explore a locked room in the basement, decorated to resemble Mackey's childhood room. They enter the bathroom and are horrified to find the missing boy's desiccated corpse in the bathtub, along with a still-living recent abductee. As they're escaping the house they see a wall of framed photographs, and they realize they're of the missing children, including a photo of Davey with his family. They present their footage to the Ipswich Police Department, who issue an APB on Mackey, marking him as wanted criminal.

Mackey, secretly hiding in Davey's attic, abducts Davey and Woody in the middle of the night and abandons them in his cruiser on an offshore island, announcing that they are to play a game of manhunt. The boys flee into the wilderness as Mackey pursues them, but lose their footing on a corpse dump. Mackey slashes Davey's leg before slitting Woody's throat. He corners Davey but decides to spare him in order to leave him paranoid and constantly in fear of his return.

Rescued and returned to daily life after a hospital stay, Davey retraces his morning paperboy route: passing Woody's foreclosed house; seeing Nikki wave goodbye to him as her custodial parent drives her away; coming upon Eats and Farraday trashing the now-demolished treehouse, both of them avoiding his gaze as they are traumatized over the death of Woody; and Mackey's house, plastered with police tape. He unfurls a newspaper, the headline announcing that the Cape May Slayer is still at large.

Cast

Production

Writing and development
In October 2021, screenwriters Matthew Leslie and Stephen J Smith appeared on The Ghost of Hollywood, where they would discuss their work on Summer of '84 in detail, including that their script was already attached to RKSS in 2015, prior to the release of Stranger Things, that there have never been plans for a film sequel, and that the budget for the film was approximately $1.5 million.

The script earned a place on the 2016 Blood List.

Filming
Principal photography took place during July 2017 in Vancouver. The film was shot using a Red camera with anamorphic lens.

Release
The film premiered at the Sundance Film Festival on January 22, 2018. It was released as midnight showings in limited theatres in the United States from August 10, 2018, by Gunpowder & Sky, followed shortly later by VOD, and streaming as a Shudder exclusive in October 2018. It had worldwide distribution deals.

Reception
The website's critical consensus reads, "Summer of 84 suffers from an overreliance on nostalgia for its titular decade, but a number of effective jolts may still satisfy genre enthusiasts." Metacritic gives the film a weighted average score of 56 out of 100, based on 8 critics, indicating "mixed or average reviews".

JoBlo.com's Movie Emporium called the ending "an inspired wrap-up" and scored it 8/10. Bloody Disgusting's Fred Topel said it "hit the sweet spot for me" and expressed a need to "talk about it excessively". Film Threat said it "lulled you into a false sense of security and banality before slamming you into a brilliantly dark chilling finale. You won't be disappointed." Daily Dead found "even though the story does take a bit too long to get things moving, that's really just me nitpicking at the greatness that is Summer of 84." PopMatters JR Kinnard said it was "a trashy classic that will absolutely rock midnight movie houses."

Variety found the film "neither funny nor scary enough to leave a lasting impression" and "more slowly paced than necessary, and those seeking horror content will find the payoff underwhelming after a protracted, mild buildup" and that "the leisurely progress isn't justified by any well-developed subplots, or by much suspense – there's never a doubt who the perp is, and apart from a couple of false-flag jump scares, little real peril surfaces until quite late." The review noted that it was unclear if the script by Matt Leslie and Stephen J. Smith was intended "to be played for satire, straight suspense, or a mixture of both." Collider scored it "F" with no positive notes.

The film won Best Screenplay for Matt Leslie and Stephen J. Smith at Cinepocalypse festival in Chicago.

It created buzz on the horror festival circuit in the United States and internationally, including featured or opening day screenings at Fantasia International Film Festival (Montreal) FrightFest (London), Sitges (Catalonia, Spain), /Slash Filmfest (Austria), and Hard:Line Film Festival (Germany). It received Jury Prize nominations at Molins Film Festival for Best Director, Best Film, and Best Screenplay.

Summer of 84 was included on multiple published best-of-year lists with notable highlights: BuzzFeed News "The 19 Best Horror Films of 2018", LA Weekly "The Ten Best Horror Movies of 2018", Thrillist's "The Best Horror Movies of 2018", Esquire "The Scariest Movies of 2018", Dread Central's "Josh Millican's Best Horror Movies of 2018", Horror News Network Top 18 Horror Films of 2018, The Ringer's "The 10 Best Horror Movies of 2018", and PopHorror's "Top 25 Favorite Horror Movies of 2018" (8/25). It is listed as one of Rotten Tomatoes' "Best Horror Movies of 2018" and "140 Best 2010s Horror Movies".

Four years after its release, Collider included it as "an essential for any summer horror movie list", Game Rant recommended it as one of 5 great horror movies to watch in the summer, and /Film suggests its dark tonal shift helps "distinguish itself from sundry other nostalgic horror rides".

Summer of 84 was horror streaming platform Shudder's second biggest film premiere of 2018, trailing only Mandy. It was nominated for a 2019 Saturn Award for Best Independent Film Release. The film poster was included as one of Rotten Tomatoes' "24 Best Movie Posters of 2018".

References

External links
 
 

2018 films
2018 horror films
2018 independent films
2010s American films
2010s Canadian films
2010s English-language films
2010s serial killer films
2010s teen horror films
American independent films
American serial killer films
American teen horror films
Canadian horror films
Canadian independent films
Canadian serial killer films
Canadian teen films
English-language Canadian films
Films set in 1984
Films set in Oregon
Films shot in Vancouver